Hina Bokhari (born 10 August 1975) is a British Liberal Democrat politician who has been a member of the London Assembly (AM) for Londonwide since May 2021. She became the joint first Muslim woman elected to the Assembly, along with Sakina Sheikh and Marina Ahmad. Bokhari has previously worked as a teacher and is a councillor in Merton.

Early life
Bokhari was born in Enfield, north London. She is the daughter of Nawazish "Naz" Bokhari and Rizwana Bokhari. Hina's younger brother is charity founder Harris Bokhari. Her Punjabi-born father Naz was the first British Muslim to run a secondary school in the UK; he was headteacher of Ernest Bevin College and was awarded an OBE for services to education in the 2001 Birthday Honours. London Mayor Sadiq Khan was one of his students.

Career
Prior to becoming politically active, Bokhari taught for 20 years in London schools and founded two youth focused charities.

Politics
Bokhari joined the Liberal Democrats in 2017, standing for election to Merton Council in 2018 and winning her seat, becoming the first Muslim woman elected in Merton.

In 2018, she came fifth in the members ballot for the Liberal Democrat list for the 2020 London Assembly election (postponed until 2021 owing to the Covid-19 pandemic). However, she was promoted to second place on the list because she was from an ethnic minority.

Bokhari was the Liberal Democrat candidate for the marginal Sutton and Cheam constituency in the 2019 general election, in which she finished second to the Conservative Party incumbent Paul Scully, despite decreasing his majority.

On 6 May 2021, Bokhari was elected as a Member of the London Assembly. Her gain was the first seat the Liberal Democrats had gained on the London Assembly since 2004.

Personal life 
In 2008, Bokhari married Martin Cooper. The couple have a son and daughter. Outside of politics, Bokhari lists her recreations as baking, saying she makes "an excellent Malteser cake", in addition to "playing board games with my kids" and "spending time with friends and family".

References

Living people
Place of birth missing (living people)
British Muslims
British people of Punjabi descent
British politicians of Pakistani descent
British schoolteachers
Councillors in the London Borough of Merton
Liberal Democrat Members of the London Assembly
Liberal Democrats (UK) councillors
Liberal Democrats (UK) parliamentary candidates
People from the London Borough of Enfield
1975 births
Women councillors in England